The County Asylums Act 1828 (9 Geo. IV, c.40, s.51) was an act of Parliament of the United Kingdom that addressed concerns with the administration of asylums and the slow creation of county asylums within Britain. It required magistrates to send annual records of admissions, discharges, and deaths to the Home Office; and allowed the Secretary of State to send a Visiting Justice to any county asylum, although the visitor couldn't intervene in how the asylum was run. It also allowed counties to borrow money to build an asylum, but it had to be paid back within 14 years of the initial loan. This was designed to incentivize counties to build asylums, but it did not make it compulsory, a continuation of the County Asylums Act 1808. It also imposed the requirement of a residential medical officer, whose permission was necessary to justify the restraint of a patient.

Background 
Issues of mistreatment and abuse, raised in a 1817 Select Committee report, quickened reform, leading to this Act of Parliament.

At the time of Royal Assent, nine county asylums had been established in England, and the need for more was growing due to overcrowding in public or charity asylums like St. Luke's Hospital for Lunatics and Bethlehem Royal Hospital.

See also 
County Asylums Act 1808
County Asylums Act 1845

References 

United Kingdom Acts of Parliament 1828
1828 in the United Kingdom